Bronx Opera (BxO) is an opera company in the Bronx, New York. It was founded in 1967 by artistic director and music director, the conductor Michael Spierman. The company is a member of the New York Opera Alliance.

The company performs two operas a year, one lesser known work, and an opera from the standard repertoire. All productions are sung in English with full orchestra and chorus. Additionally, the company presents concerts of opera excerpts throughout the year. The company's opera orchestra is increased to full-size to form the fully professional Orchestra of the Bronx which gives two free concerts every year.

Opera performances are at Lehman College's Lovinger Theatre and Hunter College's Kaye Playhouse in Manhattan's Upper East Side; concerts are given in the Bronx and surrounding areas from Long Island to Delaware County.

Origins 
In 1966, a group of musicians were attempting to put together a performance of Handel's Messiah. While this performance never happened, it was the genesis of what became the Bronx Opera. Michael Spierman, a recent graduate of New York University's University Heights campus in the Bronx (now Bronx Community College of the City University of New York) took the core of the group that was to perform the Messiah and combined it with his intention to form an opera company that would be based at the Bronx NYU campus. This organization was to be known as the Heights Opera. It was as the Heights Opera Company that the group first performed on November 24, 1967, at Vladeck Hall of the Amalgamated Housing Cooperative. The opera was Mozart's Così fan tutte.

Repertoire

References

External links
 
 Bronx Opera at BronxNet

Culture of the Bronx
New York City opera companies
Musical groups established in 1967
1967 establishments in New York City
Organizations based in the Bronx
Musical groups from the Bronx